The DuPont Building, occupying the entire block bound by 10th, 11th, Orange and Market streets, was one of the first high-rises in Wilmington, Delaware, United States. It looks out over Rodney Square. The building was built in phases, with the original building constructed in 1908 fronting Rodney Square. At the time, the building housed the offices of DuPont. In 1913, the building was expanded into a "U" by adding wings along 10th and 11th streets, the DuPont Playhouse was added, and a portion of the original 1908 section was converted into the Hotel du Pont. (Hotel du Pont is currently a member of Historic Hotels of America, the official program of the National Trust for Historic Preservation.)

Until early 2015 the building housed DuPont's headquarters. In December 2014, DuPont announced that it would move and consolidate its corporate headquarters at its nearby Chestnut Run Plaza site and that The Chemours Company, which spun off from DuPont in 2015, would move into the DuPont Building. As well as Chemours, the building houses The Playhouse on Rodney Square (formerly the DuPont Playhouse), the Hotel duPont, and a branch of M&T Bank. 

Under pressure from activist shareholders, the company first leased the building's DuPont Playhouse in January 2015 to the Grand Opera House, which renamed it The Playhouse on Rodney Square. The entire structure and the hotel business were then sold to Wilmington-based developer Buccini/Pollin in January 2018. The new owners have leased the building's office space back to Chemours, will continue to lease The Playhouse to The Grand Opera House, and have promised to keep the hotel operating.

The Hotel duPont was where Joe Biden announced his candidacy for the Delaware's 1972 United States Senate election.

Further reading

See also
 List of Historic Hotels of America

References

External links 
 Hotel du Pont 
 DuPont Theatre 
 DuPont Theatre records (1919–2001) at Hagley Museum and Library

Historic Hotels of America
DuPont
Skyscrapers in Wilmington, Delaware
Skyscraper hotels in Delaware
Skyscraper office buildings in Delaware
Theatres in Delaware
Bowman-Biltmore Hotels
Chemours
Office buildings completed in 1923
1923 establishments in Delaware
Preferred Hotels & Resorts